Admiral Mack may refer to:

Cornelius H. Mack (1885–1958), U.S. Navy rear admiral
Philip Mack (1892–1943), British Royal Navy rear admiral
William P. Mack (1915–2003), U.S. Navy vice admiral